Tavenner House is a historic home located at Parkersburg, Wood County, West Virginia.  The main house was built about 1812, and is a two-story, brick house coated in stucco in the Federal style. It has a gable roof and sits on a foundation of cut stone slabs.  The property includes a -story frame dependency with a gable roof and covered in novelty siding. It is the oldest remaining building in the Parkersburg area and is associated with Colonel Thomas Tavenner, a prominent early settler of this area.

It was listed on the National Register of Historic Places in 1982.

References

Houses in Parkersburg, West Virginia
Houses on the National Register of Historic Places in West Virginia
Federal architecture in West Virginia
Houses completed in 1812
National Register of Historic Places in Wood County, West Virginia